The Pentax smc DA 21mm F3.2 AL Limited is a moderate wide angle lens announced by Pentax on February 13, 2006. It is one of the five very compact "Limited" prime lenses for APS-C format cameras. Like its siblings, it was replaced in 2013 with a version that is HD-coated and has rounded aperture blades.

References
www.dpreview.com

External links

21
Pancake lenses
Camera lenses introduced in 2006